Periklis Amanatidis (Greek: Περικλής Αμανατίδης; born 1 August 1970) is a Greek professional football manager who is the current manager of Super League 2 club Anagennisi Karditsa.

References

1970 births
Living people
Greek football managers
Veria F.C. managers
Kozani F.C. managers
Agrotikos Asteras F.C. managers
PAS Giannina F.C. managers
Kallithea F.C. managers
Makedonikos F.C. managers
Anagennisi Karditsa F.C. managers
Niki Volos F.C. managers
PAS Lamia 1964 managers
Trikala F.C. managers
Aiginiakos F.C. managers
Panserraikos F.C. managers
Olympiacos Volos F.C. managers
Sportspeople from Thessaloniki